The Ferrari FXX is a high-performance track-only developmental prototype built by Italian automobile manufacturer Ferrari. The FXX is based on the street-legal flagship Enzo Ferrari. Production of the FXX began in 2005.

Overview

The FXX uses some technology demonstrated on the Enzo Ferrari and combines it with new developments from Ferrari and its suppliers. However, the car is only a part of the overall FXX program. Customers pay GB£2 million, but are only allowed to drive the car on special track days which are approved by Ferrari. After they drive the car, the owners are entitled to be debriefed by Ferrari on the car's performance. Ferrari's sister company Maserati, has developed a similar car, the MC12 Versione Corsa for this purpose with the only difference being that the owners can keep the car in their custody. Lamborghini also allows their track-day car, the Essenza SCV12, to be kept by the custody of their customers. The FXX may be stored by owners wherever they please. The caveat behind the FXX is only that Ferrari technicians must look over the car "before the car hits the track in any event or private testing session."

The FXX, an evolution of the Enzo in essence, shares some components with the flagship car, but numerous significant developments are unique to the FXX.

The gearbox incorporates the latest developments from Ferrari's F1 program and has a shift time of under 100 milliseconds. The brake pads were also upgraded from the Enzo. It does, however, retain the Carbon fibre-reinforced Silicon Carbide (C/SiC) ceramic composite brake discs featured on the Enzo. The tyres are custom-developed 19 inch racing slicks.

The FXX has comprehensive data-monitoring and telemetry systems that not only allow the driver to assess their performance on the track, but also provide Ferrari technicians with valuable data to improve the car and future road-going Ferrari models.

Ferrari has built 30 cars in total, adding one special edition to the 29 cars that were originally planned. The original 29 cars have all been sold to pre-selected past Ferrari customers. The 30th car was retained by Ferrari S.p.A. and presented to Ferrari's F1 World Champion driver, Michael Schumacher, along with an Enzo Ferrari when he retired from Formula One racing at the end of 2006 as a token of appreciation for his achievements. Schumacher's FXX differs from others in having black paintwork without stripes, having red trimmed wheels, matte rather than chrome exhaust tips, and his personal logo stitched on the racing seats.

The owners of the FXX also participate in Ferrari's testing and brand development programs. The purpose of this particular program is to allow Ferrari's top customers exclusive access to its most up-to-date technology and to utilise their input in the development of future models.

The model was only sold in Europe. Units can be imported, but not owned, on any other continent. A more aggressive FXX Evoluzione package was introduced in 2009 and was reported to cost €1.5 million (excluding taxes) (US$2.1 million), including the car, the crew and the services provided by Ferrari.

Specifications

 Engine:  longitudinal, rear-mid-mounted, 65-degree, naturally aspirated aluminium V12
 Valvetrain: DOHC, 4 valves per cylinder with continuously variable timing
 Fuel system: Bosch Motronic ME7 Sequential Electronic Injection
 Dry weight:  
 Max power:  at 8,500 rpm
 Power-to-weight ratio 0.69264 PS/kg or 692.64 PS per tonne
 Max torque:  at 5,750 rpm
 Weight/Power ratio: 1.44375 kg/PS
 Drivetrain: Rear-wheel drive with Traction control system
 Construction: Carbon fibre body over carbon fibre tub with rear alloy subframe
 Front brakes: Brembo CCM (carbon-ceramic) discs with 6-piston calipers, power assist ABS
 Rear brakes: Brembo CCM (carbon-ceramic) discs with 4-piston calipers, power assist ABS
 Front wheels (dimensions):  x 
 Rear wheels (dimensions):  x 
 Steering: Rack and pinion with power assistance
 Suspension: Double wishbones with push-rod actuated coil-shock units, adaptive dampers, electronic shock absorbers, anti-roll bar
 Front track: 
 Rear track: 
 Rear view is provided by a roof mounted video camera displayed on a small inboard screen.
 0–97 km/h (0–60 mph) acceleration: 2.77 seconds
 Top Speed:

FXX Evo

The Ferrari FXX program continued until 2009 (2007-2009), with the FXX Evo. The FXX Evo was improved from the standard FXX by continually adjusting specifics to generate more power and quicker gear changes, along with reducing the car's aerodynamic drag. Certain changes were made to the gearbox in order to reduce the shift time to 60 milliseconds per shift, a reduction of 20 milliseconds over the original FXX. The car also underwent aerodynamic changes and improvements to the traction control system were made in order to make the car more responsive around the track.

References

External links

Ferrari FXX Official Website
Ferrari FXX Evo Official Website
 Ferrari FXX Breaks Cover
 Ferrari FXX Information
 Ferrari FXX pictures, videos and informations (French)
 Ferrari FXX Accelerate

FXX
Rear mid-engine, rear-wheel-drive vehicles
Sports racing cars
Cars introduced in 2005